The following is a list of tunnels in California.

Rail

Mass transit

Altamont Corridor Express
BART
Balboa Park station complex
Berkeley Hills Tunnel, rapid transit tunnel, BART beneath Grizzly Peak between Orinda and Oakland
Berkeley Subway, beneath Berkeley
Broadway Subway in Oakland, including the Oakland Wye
Fremont Central Park Subway, underneath Lake Elizabeth
Market Street Subway twin level rapid transit and light rail tunnel beneath Market Street in San Francisco (shared with Muni Metro)
Milpitas station
Lundy/Sierra tunnel
Silicon Valley BART extension Phase 3 (planned)
Transbay Tube, rapid transit tunnel, BART beneath San Francisco Bay between Oakland and San Francisco
San Francisco International Airport extension
Caltrain
(five) Bayshore Cutoff, originally built by the Southern Pacific railroad, tunnel 5 abandoned in 1956
Downtown Rail Extension (proposed)
Transbay Transit Center train box
Los Angeles Metro Rail
(three) K Line (under construction)
Figueroa Tunnel, on the E Line
Flower Street tunnel, carrying the A and E Lines to the 7th Street/Metro Center station
L Line subway, between Indiana and Pico/Aliso stations
Los Angeles Subway, including the B Line and D Line
Regional Connector (under construction)
Metrolink
San Fernando Tunnel, rail tunnel, Union Pacific Railroad (formerly Southern Pacific Railroad), Santa Clarita
(three) Simi Valley Tunnels/Santa Susana Tunnels, rail tunnels, Union Pacific Railroad (formerly Southern Pacific Railroad), between Los Angeles and Simi Valley through the Santa Susana Mountains; the longest and westernmost is Tunnel No. 26
San Francisco Municipal Railway (Muni Metro)
Central Subway (under construction)
Sunset Tunnel,  light rail tunnel beneath Buena Vista Park
Twin Peaks Tunnel,  light rail tunnel beneath Twin Peaks
Market Street Subway twin level rapid transit and light rail tunnel beneath Market Street in San Francisco (shared with BART)
Sonoma–Marin Area Rail Transit
Cal Park Hill Tunnel, beneath California Park, also features a pedestrian/bicycle path
Puerto Suello Hill Tunnel, commuter rail tunnel
San Diego State University Transit Center, the only subway station in the San Diego Trolley system
Santa Clara Valley Transportation Authority light rail tunnel under San Jose Diridon station

Abandoned
Belmont Tunnel/Toluca Substation and Yard 
(five) North Pacific Coast Railroad tunnels, including:
Alto Tunnel
Tunnel 8, former Northwestern Pacific Railroad tunnel
Shepherd Canyon, used by the Sacramento Northern Railway
(five) Summit, Laurel, Zayante, Tunnel 5, and Mountain Charlie Tunnels; built by the South Pacific Coast Railroad (Tunnel 7 daylighted )

Freight and intercity rail
Fort Mason Tunnel, former rail tunnel beneath Fort Mason, San Francisco
Point Richmond Tunnel, carrying BNSF freight parallel to the road tunnel in Point Richmond
Summit Tunnel (Tunnel No. 6), abandoned rail tunnel, Central Pacific Railroad, one of a number through the Donner Pass area of the Sierra Nevada
The Big Hole, Tunnel No. 41, built to replace Tunnel No. 6 through the Donner Pass and carrying the Union Pacific Railroad 
(34) Feather River Route, including:
Chilcoot Tunnel
Spring Garden Tunnel
Keddie Wye, tunnels Tunnel No. 31 and No. 32 in the wye complex
Mission Tunnel, below Mission Santa Cruz and used by the Santa Cruz, Big Trees and Pacific Railway
(three) BNSF Gateway Subdivision
(three) BNSF Stockton Subdivision, including:
Franklin Tunnel
(six) Union Pacific Coast Subdivision
Tehachapi Loop Tunnel, rail tunnel, 1876, Union Pacific Railroad (formerly, Southern Pacific Railroad), just north of State Route 58 between Tehachapi and Bakersfield

Excursion
(two) California Western Railroad, popularly called the Skunk Train

Automotive

Dornan Tunnel, carrying Gerrard Avenue in Point Richmond parallel to the rail tunnel
Escondido Freeway (SR 15), cut-and-cover tunnel between Polk and Orange Avenues in East San Diego (Teralta Park covers the freeway)
Gaviota Tunnel, northbound US 101, Santa Barbara County
Harry Crabb Tunnel,  ramp to eastbound Interstate 80 (Alan S. Hart Freeway) from northbound Sunrise Avenue (south of Douglas Boulevard) in Roseville
John F. Foran Freeway (I-280), (southbound only) at its interchange with the 19th Avenue (SR 1) in Daly City
Lighthouse Avenue Tunnel, Monterey
Tom Lantos Tunnels/Devil's Slide Tunnels, twin tunnels, SR 1 beneath Devil's Slide between Pacifica and Montara
Wawona Tunnel, Wawona Road (SR 41), Yosemite National Park, the longest road tunnel in California at

Alameda County
11th Street Tunnel, under the Oakland Museum of California in Oakland
Caldecott Tunnel, quad tunnels, SR 24 beneath Grizzly Peak between Orinda and Oakland
Northbrae Tunnel, former East Bay Electric Lines rail tunnel, current road tunnel joining Solano Avenue and Sutter Street beneath Marin Circle, Berkeley
Posey and Webster Street Tubes, twin immersed tubes, SR 61 beneath the Oakland Estuary between Alameda and Oakland

Los Angeles County
Airport Tunnel, twin tunnels, Sepulveda Boulevard (SR 1) beneath Runways 7L/25R and 7R/25L at Los Angeles International Airport, Los Angeles
Angeles Crest Highway (State Route 2), two sets of tunnels in the San Gabriel Mountains National Monument northeast Los Angeles County between La Cañada Flintridge and Wrightwood
Angeles Forest Highway Tunnel/Singing Springs Tunnel/Hidden Springs Tunnel, Angeles Forest Highway/County Road N3, San Gabriel Mountains National Monument, north Los Angeles County between La Cañada Flintridge and Palmdale
Broadway Tunnel extended Broadway further north, later demolished
Kanan Dume Tunnel, north of Malibu
Malibu Canyon Tunnel
Figueroa Street Tunnels, northbound Arroyo Seco Parkway (SR 110), four tunnels beneath Elysian Park, Los Angeles
Foothill Freeway (I-210)
Cut-and-cover tunnel between Glendale Freeway and Angeles Crest Highway (both part of State Highway 2) in La Cañada Flintridge (Memorial Park covers the freeway)
Two short tunnels (eastbound only) under SR 710 and Ventura Freeway (SR 134) in Pasadena
Griffith Park Tunnel, Vermont Canyon Road/Mount Hollywood Drive in Griffith Park, Los Angeles
Long Beach Airport tunnels, two sets of twin tunnels for Lakewood Boulevard (SR 19) and Spring Street under runway 12/30 at Long Beach Airport, Long Beach
McClure Tunnel, SR 1 located at the western terminus of I-10 in Santa Monica
Newhall Pass Tunnels, two tunnels about  each, southbound truck bypass lanes of the Golden State Freeway (I5), in Santa Clarita and Los Angeles
Orange Freeway (SR 57), (northbound only) at its interchange with the Pomona Freeway (SR 60) in Diamond Bar
Santa Ana Freeway portion of US 101 (northbound only), at its interchange with the San Bernardino Freeway (SR 10) in downtown Los Angeles
Second Street Tunnel, beneath Bunker Hill, downtown Los Angeles
Third Street Tunnel, beneath Bunker Hill, downtown Los Angeles
Sepulveda Boulevard Tunnel, Sepulveda Boulevard under Mulholland Drive at the north end of Sepulveda Pass, Los Angeles
Van Nuys Airport Tunnel, twin tunnels, Sherman Way under runway 16R/34L at Van Nuys Airport, west San Fernando Valley, Los Angeles

Marin County
Baker-Barry Tunnel, single lane tunnel, Bunker Rd, Sausalito
Robin Williams Tunnel/Waldo Tunnel, twin tunnels, US 101 and SR 1, Sausalito

Orange County
Main Street under the Santa Ana Freeway (I5) in Tustin, California
SR 133 segment of the Eastern Transportation Corridor toll road, (northbound only) at its interchange with the SR 241 (Foothill Transportation Corridor) in Irvine
SR 261 segment of the Eastern Transportation Corridor toll road, (northbound only) at its interchange with the SR 241 (Eastern Transportation Corridor) in Orange

San Francisco
Broadway Tunnel, twin tunnels, Broadway beneath Russian Hill
MacArthur Tunnel, SR 1 beneath the Presidio of San Francisco (Golden Gate National Recreation Area)
Masonic Tunnel, carrying Geary Boulevard under Masonic Avenue
Presidio Parkway, US 101 through the Presidio of San Francisco (replacement for the elevated Doyle Drive)
Stockton Street Tunnel, beneath a portion of Chinatown
Yerba Buena Tunnel, twin tunnels, I-80 near the middle of the San Francisco–Oakland Bay Bridge complex, Yerba Buena Island

Abandoned
Kennedy Tunnel, former road above the extant Caldecott Tunnel (see above)

Utility
Angeles Tunnel
Claremont Tunnel
Hetch Hetchy Coast Range tunnel
(three) Inland Feeder
Arrowhead West Tunnel
Arrowhead East Tunnel
Riverside Badlands Tunnel
Mile Rock
San Jacinto Tunnel
South Bay Aqueduct
Trinity Diversion Tunnel: a 10.7 mile tunnel diverting water from the Trinity Basin to the Sacramento Valley.

Mining
Burro Schmidt Tunnel, mining tunnel, east of Red Rock Canyon State Park, eastern Kern County

Military and Industry
 SpaceX constructed a 1.4 Mile test tunnel underneath the parking lot of its Hawthorne plant for experimental transportation technology.
 United States Airforce Plant 42 in Palmdale is rumored to have an underground network of tunnels connecting to nearby defense plants including Lockheed's Skunk works.
 Ft. McArthur Tunnel Complex: an abandoned World War II network connecting fortifications in San Pedro, CA.
 The Lawson Adit is a tunnel constructed underneath UC Berkeley into the Berkeley Hills in the early 1900s for student mining research.
 US Dept. of Defense Tunnel Warfare Center, China Lake
 The Stanford Linear Accelerator operates in a 10,000-foot concrete tunnel, 25 feet underground.
 Vandenberg Space Force Base has a number of underground tunnels to support rocket launch operations.

See also
List of tunnels in the United States

References

Tunnels
Tunnels
California